Fisheye may refer to:

 The eye providing vision in fish or other aquatic creature resembling a fish
 Fisheye lens, an ultra wide-angle lens used in photography
 Fisheye (Sailor Moon), a character from the anime Sailor Moon
 Fisheye (album), the second album by the alternative rock band Callalily
 FishEye (software), a revision-control browser by Atlassian Software Systems
 Fish Eye Marine Park in Piti Bomb Holes Marine Preserve, Guam
 A blemish of spray painting, caused by contamination with oil or water
 ◉, a circled dot symbol